Dairon Blanco is the name of:

Dairon Blanco (baseball) (born 1993), Cuban baseball player
Dairon Blanco (footballer) (1992–2020), Cuban footballer